The Knightsbrook River is a river in County Meath, Ireland.

The river rises near Summerhill, and flows north past the R156, and later the R158 and R159 roads, through Knightsbrook, and merges into the River Boyne a few kilometres to the east of Trim.

References 

Rivers of County Meath